The Empire City Handicap was an American Thoroughbred horse race inaugurated on October 22, 1900, as part of the opening day racecard at Empire City Race Track in Yonkers, New York. Sometimes referred in newspaper reports as the Empire City Stakes, it was raced at the Empire City track through 1942 then the following year it moved to the Jamaica Race Course in Jamaica, Queens where it remained until its final running on November 7, 1953.

The first edition of the Empire City Handicap was open to horses age three and older. From 1937 until its final running in 1953, the race was restricted to three-year-old horses. There was no race run 1901-1906, and 1911-1913. That inaugural running was won by Charentus in a World record time of 2:04 flat for a mile and a quarter on dirt.

During its tenure, the Empire City Handicap was contested at various distances:
 1 mile : 1907
  miles : 1908-1910, 1914–1922, 1934–1941
  miles : 1942-1953
  miles : 1900, 1923–1933

Records
Speed record:
 1:50.00 @ 1 M : Swing And Sway (1941)
 1:56.00 @ 1 M : Apache (1942)
 2:03.00 @ 1 M : Sting (1924)

Most wins:
 2 - Peanuts (1926, 1927)

Most wins by a jockey:
 2 - Laverne Fator (1922, 1925)
 2 - Johnny Longden (1935, 1943)
 2 - Nick Wall (1939, 1950)
 2 - James Stout (1940, 1942)
 2 - Eddie Arcaro (1944, 1949)
 2 - Ted Atkinson (1945, 1952)
 2 - Eric Guerin (1946, 1953)

Most wins by a trainer:
 6 - James E. Fitzsimmons (1930, 1932, 1934, 1940, 1942, 1946)

Most wins by an owner:
 5 - Belair Stud (1930, 1934, 1940, 1942, 1946)

Winners

References

1900 establishments in New York (state)
1900 in sports in New York (state)
1953 disestablishments in New York (state)
1953 in sports in New York City
20th century in Queens
Defunct sports competitions in the United States
Empire City Race Track
Discontinued horse races in New York (state)
Jamaica Race Course
Open middle distance horse races
Recurring sporting events disestablished in 1953
Recurring sporting events established in 1900
Sports competitions in New York City